Bahrain Watch is a "research and advocacy organisation" devoted to issues related to Bahrain. In 2013 the group led a campaign to block a shipment of 1.6 million tear gas canisters from South Korea to Bahrain's Interior Ministry.

Among the group's members is cyber-activist Ali Abdulemam.

References

External links

Human rights organisations based in Bahrain